The 1986 Speedway World Pairs Championship was the seventeenth FIM Speedway World Pairs Championship. The final took place in Pocking, West Germany. The championship was won by Denmark who beat United States after Run-Off (both 46 points). Bronze medal was won by Czechoslovakia (32 points).

Semifinal 1
  Lonigo
 May 11

Semifinal 2
  Pardubice
 May 18

World final
  Pocking, Rottalstadion
 June 11

See also
 1986 Individual Speedway World Championship
 1986 Speedway World Team Cup
 motorcycle speedway
 1986 in sports

References

1986
Speedway World Pairs
Speedway World Pairs
Speedway